St. Peter is a Roman Catholic church in Bridgeport, Connecticut, part of the Diocese of Bridgeport.

History 
This Gothic Revival church dates from 1940 and was designed by Anthony J. DePace of New York. Mr. DePace was awarded Honorable Mention for Holy Year (Rome, Italy) for his design of this church.

References

External links 
 Diocese of Bridgeport

Anthony J. DePace church buildings
Roman Catholic churches completed in 1940
Roman Catholic churches in Bridgeport, Connecticut
Roman Catholic Diocese of Bridgeport
20th-century Roman Catholic church buildings in the United States